Minesweeping Group 50 may refer to:
Minesweeping Group 50 of the Royal Navy that was based at Dover, England
Minesweeping Group 50 of the Royal Australian Navy that was based in Sydney, Australia